The Kluskus Lakes  are a group of lakes on the northern perimeter of the Chilcotin District of the Central Interior of British Columbia, Canada.  They are located east of Tsacha Lake and south of the Euchiniko Lakes and are part of the drainage of the West Road River (aka Blackwater River).  Fort Kluskus was located in the vicinity, which today includes numerous Indian Reserves of the eponymous Kluskus First Nation.  The Kluskus Hills are also located between the Kluskus Lakes and the Euchiniko Lakes. "Kluskus" is the English rendering of the Carrier language word lhoosk'uz, meaning "the side of the fish is white".

References

Lakes of the Chilcotin
Nechako Country
Dakelh
Range 4 Coast Land District